Sic semper tyrannis is a Latin phrase meaning "thus always to tyrants". In contemporary parlance, it means tyrannical leaders will inevitably be overthrown. 

The phrase also suggests that bad but justified outcomes should, or eventually will, befall tyrants.

History

Before 509 BC, Rome was ruled by kings. The last was Lucius Tarquinius Superbus. The king's son, Sextus Tarquinius, raped a noblewoman, Lucretia, who revealed the offense to various Roman noblemen and then died by suicide. The noblemen obtained the support of the aristocracy and the people to expel the king and his family and to institute the Roman Republic. The leader of the noblemen was Lucius Junius Brutus, who became one of the first consuls of the Republic. It has been suggested that the phrase was used at this event, but the suggestion is not based on any literature of the time.

A descendant of Brutus was Senator Marcus Junius Brutus, who took part in the assassination of Julius Caesar on 15 March 44 BC. While he is sometimes credited with originating the phrase, Plutarch suggests he either did not have a chance to say anything, or if he did, no one heard it:

Mike Fontaine, professor of Classics at Cornell University, proposes that the expression is probably a Latin translation by the US founder George Wythe of what Tiberius Gracchus’ grandfather, the general and statesman Scipio Aemilianus, said when he heard of the assassination of his grandson. According to Plutarch (21.4), he reacted by quoting Homer’s Odyssey (1.47): ὡς ἀπόλοιτο καὶ ἄλλος, ὅτις τοιαῦτά γε ῥέζοι. 

The phrase has been invoked as an epithet about one allegedly abusing power, or as a rallying cry against abuse of power.

Usage in the United States

The phrase was recommended by George Mason to the Virginia Convention in 1776, as part of the commonwealth's seal. The Seal of the Commonwealth of Virginia shows Virtue, spear in hand, with her foot on the recumbent form of Tyranny, whose crown lies nearby. The Seal was planned by Mason and designed by George Wythe, who signed the United States Declaration of Independence and taught law to Thomas Jefferson.  A joke referencing the image on the seal that dates as far back as the Civil War, is that "Sic semper tyrannis" actually means "Get your foot off my neck."

"Happy While United" was the slogan on a medal coined by the State of Virginia in 1780. First envisioned by Thomas Jefferson, the medal was minted and designed to be given to Indian signatories to the treaties Jefferson planned with the Indians of Virginia. The medal portrays a Virginia colonial, sitting, enjoying a peace pipe with a Native American. The obverse portrays a variation of the Virginia state seal of the state symbol standing triumphant over a slain enemy with the legend: "Rebellion to Tyrants Is Obedience to God".

The phrase is the motto of the United States Navy attack submarine named for the state, the USS Virginia.  Before that, it was the motto of the nuclear-powered cruiser USS Virginia.

The phrase appears on the Insignia of the 149th Fighter Squadron which is located at Joint Base Langley–Eustis, Virginia.

John Tyler's father, John Tyler Sr., uttered the phrase to a schoolteacher who had been tied up by Tyler and his fellow pupils.

During the Civil War, at least one regiment of the United States Colored Troops used it as their motto.

John Wilkes Booth wrote in his diary that he shouted "Sic semper tyrannis" after shooting U.S. President Abraham Lincoln on April 14, 1865, in part because of the association with the assassination of Caesar. The phrase was also in the pro-Confederate Civil War song "Maryland, My Maryland", which was popular at the time with Southern sympathizers in Maryland, such as Booth. The song, containing the phrase, was the official state song of Maryland from 1939 until 2021. In May 2021, Governor Larry Hogan signed a bill to remove its status as state song without a replacement.

Timothy McVeigh was wearing a T-shirt with this phrase and a picture of Lincoln on it when he was arrested on April 19, 1995, the day of the Oklahoma City bombing.

The phrase is also the motto of Allentown, Pennsylvania, the third largest city in Pennsylvania.

See also
Tyrannicide

References

External links
Webster entry – audio pronunciation

Latin mottos
Latin quotations
State mottos of the United States
Symbols of Virginia
Symbols of Maryland
Assassination of Abraham Lincoln
Assassination of Julius Caesar
Latin words and phrases
Totalitarianism
Political opposition
Political quotes
Marcus Junius Brutus